Crimson Polaris was a cargo ship that split in two in August 2021.

History
Crimson Polaris was a cargo ship that was completed in 2008. On 11 August 2021, it ran aground in Hachinohe, Japan nearing the end of a sailing from Thailand carrying 44,000 tonnes of wood chips. The stern sank while the front section was towed to port for unloading.

References

External links

Merchant ships of Panama
Maritime incidents in 2021
August 2021 events in Japan
2008 ships
Ships built in Japan